A dhaba is a roadside restaurant in the Indian subcontinent, primarily across Pakistan and India. They are on highways, generally serve local cuisine, and also serve as truck stops. They are most commonly found next to petrol stations, and most are open 24 hours a day.

Dhabas are a common feature on national and state highways. Earlier frequented only by truck drivers, today eating at a dhaba, whether urban or roadside, is a trend.

Etymology
The word has been alleged in folk etymology to stem from dabba, m., box, lunch box, tiffin.

Dhabas sprung up first on GT Road which ran from Peshawar, Rawalpindi and Lahore through Amritsar, Ludhiana and further to Delhi and Calcutta.

There is now a large network of the Indian and Pakistani immigrant communities worldwide, and many have opened dhabas in far lands (such as at service stations on the Trans-Canada Highway network).

Dhabas were characterized by mud structures and cots to sit upon (charpai) while eating. A wooden plank would be placed across the width of the cot on which to place the dishes. With time, the cots were replaced by tables. The food is typically inexpensive and has a 'homemade' feel to it.

Cuisine
Indian and Pakistani food served in dhabas is wholesome and full of rustic flavour. Food is served on big brass or steel thali (plates) and drinks – water, lassi, milk (of several varieties), or tea, as well as shorbas (soups) – are served.

Two types of food are served in the dhabas – non-vegetarian cuisine (which is the most popular) and vegetarian fare termed vaishno dhabas (where food is cooked in pure ghee or clarified white butter). Dal makhni is a popular dish in the vegetarian dhaba.

Tandoor 
The tandoor (also called ‘tandooria’ or dhatti) is a barrel-shaped clay or earthenware oven, which makes the cuisine special. It is a versatile kitchen appliance for making rotis and naans and a social institution. In villages across Pakistan and India, the community tandoor, dug in the ground and either coal-fired or (more recently) electrically heated, is a meeting place for women, who bring the kneaded atta (dough) and sometimes marinated meats to have them cooked while socializing. Until a few years ago, this phenomenon existed in urban neighbourhoods, too. Even today, a few neighbourhoods in Delhi and Lahore have a community tandoor. Many towns peppered on the way from Karachi to Islamabad Pakistan have many similar community tandoors.

Ingredients 
Most menus are made according to the season. The universal favourite in Pakistan is dal (daal) while, in India it is chole bhature - both of which are a year-round items and are available at every wayside dhaba; it originated in Northern India but is now found anywhere in the Indian subcontinent or other countries where the South Asian diaspora have migrated in large numbers. But, the pride of the Punjabi winter cuisine is sarson ka saag (curry made out of mustard leaves) served with blobs of white butter accompanied by makki ki roti and lassi.

Some dishes are:

Wheat and maize (the staple food grains), all lentils, especially black gram and yellow gram, rajma (kidney beans), and chana.
Popular spices in desi cuisine are coriander, cumin, cloves, cinnamon, cardamom, black pepper, red chili powder, turmeric, and mustard. One of the main crops is mustard or sarson: Its leaves are used to make sarson da-saag curry while its seeds are used for tempering and for making mustard oil, which is widely used as a cooking medium.
Milk and dairy products such as dahi, paneer  cream, butter and ghee are used. Butter is an important cooking medium apart from being consumed raw along with the food.
Non-vegetarian food, especially chicken, is a favourite. Mutton and fish are also cooked.
All types of vegetables

Vegetarian specialities 

The simple vegetarian meal served could be a paratha of many kinds depending on the type of vegetable stuffing one wishes to have – the aloo parathas is the most popular. Parathas stuffed with cooked, mashed and spiced vegetables such as cauliflower are popular for breakfast with curds or tea.

Vegetarian meal – for lunch or dinner – consists of chana masala, pindi chana, vegetables and lentils, sarson ka saag, palak paneer, bharwan karela, subz korma, rajma or kadhi.

Paneer dishes are a must in a vegetarian menu. It is cooked with every kind of vegetable, the popular dishes of such variety are palak paneer or saag paneer, mutter paneer, paneer makhani etc.

Naan and paratha, rotis made of maize flour (makki di roti), chappatis made out of the flour of maize and rumali roti are typical Indian breads.

The basic gravy used for vegetables and meat dishes is onion-tomato-garlic-ginger.

Rice 
A predominantly wheat-eating people, the Punjabis cook rice only on special occasions. Rice is rarely cooked plain or steamed and is always made with a flavouring of cumin or fried onions. Sada chawal – plain rice – is served with other wheat-based dishes. Vegetable biryani (fried veg rice) is also a favourite dish.

In winter, is rice cooked with jaggery is gurwala chawal, or rao ki kheer delicacy when cooked on slow fire for hours with sugarcane juice, and sometimes rice is also cooked with green peas.

Non-vegetarian options 
Authentic items include kadhai murg, tandoori chicken, tali machali amritsar, rara gosht, chicken tikka masala, peppery tandoori chicken., anda paneer (egg curry), seek kebabs, butter chicken, vegetarian and non-vegetarian kathi rolls, etc.

Non-vegetarian popular starters include kebabs – Gosht Pudhina Sheek, Tangri and Macchi Hariyali Tikka and Chicken Tikka.

Murg yakhni shorba and chicken shorba are popular soups.

Most meat delicacies are eaten with plain rice, phulka or tandoori roti without ghee or butter.

Sweets or desserts 

Sweets include firni or phirni (a sweet dish made of milk, rice flour, and sugar and chilled in earthenware bowls), gulab jamun and burfi. The desserts include fresh hot jalebi with vanilla ice cream, rasmalai and kesari kheer.

The saffron-mixed buttermilk (lassi) of Amritsar; milk boiled with almonds, pistachio, and dry-dates in winter; and the same mix boiled into a thick liquid and then solidified in a banana-shaped mould in the form of a kulfi are desserts. Panjiri, whole wheat flour fried in sugar and ghee, heavily laced with dry-fruits and herbal gums is in eaten in the winters to ward off cold.

Regional variations
Haryana has dhabas all over and dhabas of Murthal, Sonipat on Grand Trunk Road are famous for delicacies including Murthal Paratha, Haryanvi Daal, Cheese Bread Pakora and more. "Garam Dharam" (Hot Dharam) vegetarian dhaba based on Sholay theme at Murthal Sonipat, with fruit parathas as one of its speciality, is owned by the Bollywood action hero Dharmendra.

Overseas
The word has come to represent cuisine of the Indian subcontinent so much that many Indian restaurants in Asia (Bangkok), Europe and Americas (Trinidad and Tobago) have adopted it as a part of the name.

See also

 Indian cuisine
 Pakistani cuisine
 Dabbawalas of Mumbai
 Cha chaan teng Hong Kong diners
 Greasy spoons
 Hawker centres of Singapore
 Kopi tiam in Southeast Asia
 Tapri in central and south India
 Truck stops in North America
 Kesar Da Dhaba
 Mamak stall of Malaysia and Singapore

References

Restaurants by type
Transport culture of India
Punjabi culture
Restaurants in India
Trucking subculture
Indian trucking industry